Apidya (titled  in Japanese characters below the title) is a horizontally scrolling shoot 'em up video game developed by German studio Kaiko and released by Play Byte in 1992 for the Amiga. It was Kaiko's second game developed. Despite being labelled II in the title it is not a sequel to any game, but has the digits placed there simply for a gag.

Gameplay

The game is a horizontally scrolling shooter, with some elements similar to early, classic shoot 'em ups. The story revolves around Ikuro, whose wife Yuri has been poisoned by Hexaae, an evil lord of black magic. Ikuro uses magic to transform into a deadly bee and vows to find an antidote for Yuri and wreak revenge on Hexaae.

The player controls a bee capable of launching a number of projectiles which can damage or destroy enemy targets. The game uses the power-up bar system pioneered by Gradius. Destroyed enemies sometimes leave a power-up in the form of a red-and-yellow flower. The player may collect these flowers and activate new weapons and enhancements. A 'build-up' weapon, similar to the 'beam' weapon in R-Type, also features. If the fire button is held down for a second or two, the bee produces a hissing noise and releasing the fire button will then cause the bee to fire a large, organic projectile (a giant bee stinger) which can wipe out waves of small enemies, or damage larger ones.

If the player's bee is hit by enemy fire or crashes into the terrain, a life will be lost and the current stage is restarted except for the end bosses of the first 3 stages, that will continue till all lives are lost. Once all lives are lost the game ends. A co-operative two-player mode is possible, in which the second player controls a smaller companion drone, which can launch small projectiles and shield the first player. The drone can sustain 5 small projectiles per life but won't survive large projectiles or collisions and the stage doesn't reset if it dies, the large bee is the alpha which must survive to advance. The alpha bee dying resets the stage as with normal play minus end stage bosses for the first 3 stages. An alternating two player mode is also possible.

The game consists of five themed levels: a meadow, a pond, a sewer filled with mutated enemies, a bio-technological machine and a final level where the player must battle five final bosses. The final level offers plenty of points for slain enemies, offering a semi status quo for players as they will recover some lost lives from restarting the level.
Each level is divided up into a number of stages (usually three where the last is the end boss, that doesn't reset upon losing a life only on credit). There is also a number of hidden bonus levels. In the first two levels, nearly all the enemies are real creatures which may be found in a meadow or pond. The later levels feature mutant and inorganic creations. During "Techno Party", the bee morphs into a more mechanized form for the duration of that level. The first boss is unique, it cannot be harmed so the player must survive till it vacates the game.
There are four difficulty settings. When the difficulty is set to "easy", it is not possible to play the last level, the ending sequence is skipped and the player is directed straight to the end credits.

Music
The musical soundtrack to the game was composed by game musician Chris Huelsbeck. A high-quality arrangement of the soundtrack was released as a CD album in 1992. The soundtrack of level 4 features several samples from L.A. Style's James Brown Is Dead.

There have also been live performances of the game's music:

 An Apidya suite was performed live by a full symphonic orchestra in 2003 at the Symphonic Game Music Concert series in Leipzig, Germany.
 Music from Apidya was part of the 2006 PLAY!, a Video Game Symphony concert in Stockholm, Sweden.
 Music from Apidya (as well as many of Hülsbeck's other works) was played by a symphonic orchestra at the Symphonic Shades concert in 2008.
 Music from Apidya was featured on the Amiga Power; Album with Attitude.
 Music from Apidya as a tribute do the Amiga, featured on album Project Paula - Amiga performed and mixed by Volkor X in 2017.

Reception
The game was largely praised as a fine example of the shoot 'em up genre. Amiga Power magazine described the game as offering "more playability than any other shoot 'em up" and awarded the game 89% in 1992. Amiga Format magazine awarded the game 90%.

Legacy
An unofficial GBA Apidya technical demo followed years later, and an unofficial Windows remake of the first level was released in 2002 but neither was ever completed.

References

1992 video games
Amiga games
Amiga-only games
Horizontally scrolling shooters
Japan in non-Japanese culture
Multiplayer and single-player video games
Video games about insects
Video games about shapeshifting
Video games scored by Chris Huelsbeck
Video games developed in Germany
Fictional bees